Garden of Remembrance may be:

Garden of Remembrance (Dublin), Ireland
Garden of Remembrance (Belfast), Northern Ireland
Garden of Remembrance, Lockerbie, Scotland, see: Pan Am Flight 103#Memorials and tributes
Garden of Remembrance (Seattle)
Garden of Remembrance (album), by Oneiroid Psychosis

See also
War memorial